Patrick Joseph McElroy (1932 – 28 October 2022) was a Gaelic footballer from Northern Ireland. He played with club sides Liatroim Fontenoys and Glenn, and at inter-county level with the Down senior football team.

Career

McElroy first played Gaelic football as a schoolboy at St. Colman's College in Newry. He was at midfield on the college's first MacRory Cup-winning team in 1949, before retaining the title in 1950. McElroy's performances for St. Colman's resulted in him being selected for the Ulster colleges team. He later lined out with University College Dublin and won a Sigerson Cup medal in 1953. At club level, McElroy began his career with Liatroim Fontenoys before later winning consecutive Down SFC medals with Glenn in 1962 and 1963.

McElroy made his first championship appearance for the Down senior football team against Derry in 1953. He was a regular on the team for the next few years and also lined out for Ulster in the Railway Cup, however, his inter-county career was temporarily halted when he undertook a forestry course in Wales from 1955 to 1957. McElroy re-joined the team upon his return and won the first of three successive Ulster SFC medals in 1959. He added a National League title to his collection in 1960 before also winning the first of two consecutive All-Ireland SFC titles that season, as the Sam Maguire Cup crossed the border for the first time. McElroy won a second league title in 1962 before bringing an end to his career after Down's defeat in the 1962 Ulster final.

Personal life and death

McElroy worked as a forester and spent a number of years working in Tollymore Forest in Co. Down alongside the head forester Alfred A. Rogers, helping to create and run Northern Ireland's first state forest park. He also worked as a consultant with Ballycassidy Sawmills. His wife Bridie, whom he married in 1962, was a sister of John and Felix McKnight who played Gaelic football with Armagh. Another brother-in-law, Kevin O'Neill, was a contemporary of McElroy's on the Down team.

McElroy died at the Ulster Hospital 8 October 2022, at the age of 90.

Honours

St. Colman's College
MacRory Cup: 1949, 1950

University College Dublin
Sigerson Cup: 1953

Glenn
Down Senior Football Championship: 1962, 1963

Down
All-Ireland Senior Football Championship: 1960, 1961
Ulster Senior Football Championship: 1959, 1960, 1961
National Football League: 1959–60, 1961–62

References

1932 births
2022 deaths
Down inter-county Gaelic footballers
Foresters
Liatroim Fontenoys Gaelic footballers
UCD Gaelic footballers
Ulster inter-provincial Gaelic footballers